Ambanwala is a village in Sri Lanka. It is located within Central Province.

See also
List of towns in Central Province, Sri Lanka

External links

Populated places in Kandy District
Geography of Kandy District